Coëtivy Airport  is an airport serving Coëtivy Island in the Seychelles.

The Coetivy non-directional beacon (Ident: COE) is located just south of the field.

See also

Transport in Seychelles
List of airports in Seychelles

References

External links
OpenStreetMap - Coëtivy
OurAirports - Coëtivy
FallingRain - Coëtivy Airport

Airports in Seychelles